Dirk Jan de Geer (14 December 1870 – 28 November 1960) was a Dutch politician of the defunct Christian Historical Union (CHU) now merged into the Christian Democratic Appeal (CDA). He served as Prime Minister of the Netherlands from 8 March 1926 until 10 August 1929 and from 10 August 1939 until 3 September 1940.

Life
Born in Groningen, he was a descendant of the De Geer family. After receiving his J.D. in 1895, De Geer worked as a journalist and acted as the town councillor of Rotterdam (1901–1907).

He served from 1907 as a Christian Historical member of Parliament. De Geer was a stable and respected politician before World War II. From 1920 to 1921, de Geer served as mayor of Arnhem. Between 1921 and 1923, he served as Minister of Finance. He resigned in 1923 because of his disagreement with the Naval Law of 1924. From 1925 to 1926, he served as Minister of the Interior and Minister of Agriculture. He was Prime Minister from 8 March 1926 to 10 August 1929. He also served as Minister of Finances from 1926 to 1933.

After the end of the fifth cabinet of Colijn, he was again asked to form a government in August 1939 and concurrently held the offices of Minister of Finance and of General Affairs. However, he was not suited for the role of prime minister of a nation at war, as he knew himself. When Nazi Germany attacked the Netherlands on 10 May 1940 (beginning of the Western campaign), the situation soon became very serious, and the government fled to Britain.

In Britain, De Geer advocated negotiating a separate peace between the Netherlands and Germany and damaged the Dutch government and Dutch morale by openly stating that the war could never be won. He was finally removed from office on the instigation of Queen Wilhelmina and replaced by Pieter Sjoerds Gerbrandy, officially on account of ill health.

Later, he was sent with a diplomatic package to the Dutch East Indies, now Indonesia. He never arrived there since on a stopover in Portugal, he left the flight and went to the Germans. who allowed him to return to his ailing wife and the rest of his family in the Netherlands.

That greatly angered Wilhelmina, who called him a traitor and deserter to the Dutch cause. He later wrote a controversial leaflet with "instructions" for the people on how to co-operate with the Germans. "With this pamphlet", the Dutch government-in-exile stated in a broadcast, "the writer has betrayed the Netherlands people, whatever happens to him personally". Wilhelmina warned De Geer that if he published the pamphlet, he would be put on trial after the conclusion of the war.

With the permission of the Reichskommissariat Niederlande, De Geer went through with the publication. After the war, he was found guilty of high treason in time of war and was stripped of all of his honorary titles. The Appeal Court confirmed the sentence of a year's imprisonment, with three years' probation but waived the fine of 20,000 guilders and the deprivation of the title "Minister of State".

He died some 15 years later in Soest.

Personal
On 11 August 1904, De Geer married Maria Voorhoeve (1 May 1883 – 6 April 1955).

His grandson is ex-footballer Boudewijn de Geer, and his great-grandson is current footballer Mike de Geer.

Death
De Geer died on 28 November 1960 at Soest, Netherlands, at the age of 89, 16 days before his 90th birthday and several years after having suffered a stroke.

Decorations

References

External links

 
  Jhr.Mr. D.J. (Dirk) de Geer Parlement & Politiek

 
 

 
 
 

 

 

1870 births
1960 deaths
Chairmen of the Christian Historical Union
Christian Historical Party politicians
Christian Historical Union politicians
Dirk Jan de Geer
Dutch jurists
Dutch magazine editors
Dutch members of the Dutch Reformed Church
Dutch political writers
Dutch people of World War II
Jonkheers of the Netherlands
Leaders of the Christian Historical Union
Mayors of Arnhem
Members of the Provincial Council of South Holland
Members of the Provincial-Executive of South Holland
Municipal councillors of Rotterdam
Members of the House of Representatives (Netherlands)
Ministers of Agriculture of the Netherlands
Ministers of Finance of the Netherlands
Ministers of the Interior of the Netherlands
Ministers of State (Netherlands)
People from Arnhem
Politicians from Groningen (city)
People from Schiedam
People from Soest, Netherlands
Prime Ministers of the Netherlands
Utrecht University alumni
World War II political leaders
20th-century Dutch civil servants
20th-century Dutch male writers
20th-century Dutch politicians